Rikers High (also known as Lykeio Rikers) is a 2005 American and French documentary film directed by Victor Buhler. The film looks at Island Academy the high school for inmates of Rikers Island, the largest correctional facility in North America. This film has been music composed by Marc Anthony Thompson.

Cast
 Andre Blandon
 Millie Grant
 John Hopson
 Shawn Johnson
 Sara McCullah
 Iris Ortiz
 Gustavo Rodríguez
 William Santiago
 Joseph Sprolling
 Steven Torres

References

External links
 
 

2005 films
Films set in New York City
American documentary films
2005 documentary films
French documentary films
Rikers Island
2000s English-language films
2000s American films
2000s French films
English-language French films